Roata de Jos is a commune located in Giurgiu County, Muntenia, Romania. It is composed of four villages: Cartojani, Roata de Jos, Roata Mică and Sadina.

References

External links 

Communes in Giurgiu County
Localities in Muntenia